Pleurothallis bivalvis is a species of orchid plant native to Bolivia, Colombia, Costa Rica, Ecuador, French Guiana, Guyana, Mexico, Panama, Peru, Suriname, Trinidad-Tobago, and Venezuela.

References 

bivalvis
Flora of Bolivia
Flora of Colombia
Flora of Costa Rica
Flora of Ecuador
Flora of Guyana
Flora of Mexico
Flora of Panama
Flora of Peru
Flora of Suriname
Flora of Trinidad and Tobago
Flora of Venezuela
Plants described in 1846
Flora without expected TNC conservation status